The Blanche River (in French: rivière Blanche) is a tributary of the rivière au Pin which is a tributary of the Bécancour River; the latter flows onto the south shore of the St. Lawrence River.

The Blanche River flows through the municipalities of Saint-Jacques-le-Majeur-de-Wolfestown and Saint-Julien, in the Les Appalaches Regional County Municipality (MRC), in the administrative region of Chaudière-Appalaches, in province of Quebec, in Canada.

Geography 

The main neighboring watersheds of the Blanche river are:
 north side: rivière au Pin, Bécancour River, Strater pond;
 east side: Bécancour River, Breeches Lake, Coleraine River;
 south side: Coulombe North River, Aunière stream, lake Nicolet;
 west side: Nicolet River, rivière des Vases, Grimard stream, Bulstrode River.

The Blanche River originates in the mountains on the north shore of Lake Breeches, in the municipality of Saint-Jacques-le-Majeur-de-Wolfestown.

From its head area, the Blanche river flows over  divided into the following segments:
  north, to route 263;
  north, up to the fourth rang road bridge;
  north, to the municipal boundary between Saint-Jacques-le-Majeur-de-Wolfestown and Saint-Julien;
  north, to a road bridge;
  east, until you reach a road;
  towards the northeast, up to its confluence.

The Blanche River empties on the west bank of the rivière au Pin.

Toponymy 

The toponym “rivière Blanche” was made official on August 7, 1978, at the Commission de toponymie du Québec.

See also 

 List of rivers of Quebec

References 

Rivers of Chaudière-Appalaches
Les Appalaches Regional County Municipality